Abert Rim in Lake County, Oregon is one of the highest fault scarps in the United States. It was formed during the Miocene epoch. At that time basaltic flood lavas covered much of eastern Oregon. In subsequent faulting, great blocks were tilted and Abert Rim is at the western end of one of these blocks, while Lake Abert lies on top of another.

Bighorn sheep were transplanted to the rim in 1975 and 1977 from nearby Hart Mountain, and are often spotted from the Abert Rim geologic point of interest sign located along Highway 395. Raptors, such as the Ferruginous Hawk, are also common in the area.

The Chewaucan River enters Lake Abert from the south, however it has no outlet. The lake level varies depending on rainfall and it nearly completely dried up 140 years ago. It is one of the Great Basin lakes.

The escarpment and lake were first mapped on December 20, 1843, by John C. Frémont, who named it after Colonel John James Abert, his commanding officer.

The southern section of Abert Rim is a popular spot for paragliding and hang gliding because of the frequent thermals created by warm valley air rising up against the cliffs.  The area was formerly considered by many to be the hang gliding capital of the West until paragliding superseded it in popularity.  National free flight festivals are held each year in late June and during the Fourth of July.

See also
 Burma Rim
 Basin and Range Province
 Geology of the Pacific Northwest

References

External links

 

Landforms of Lake County, Oregon
Escarpments of the United States